Sonny Stitt & the Top Brass is an album by saxophonist Sonny Stitt recorded in 1962 and released on the Atlantic label.

Reception

In his review for Allmusic, Scott Yanow stated "The charts give this Stitt album more variety than usual, and the superior material challenges the saxophonist to play at his best".

Track listing 
All compositions by Sonny Stitt except as indicated
 "Souls Valley" (Richard Carpenter) – 4:31     
 "Coquette" (Johnny Green, Gus Kahn, Carmen Lombardo) – 3:18     
 "On a Misty Night" (Tadd Dameron) – 4:04     
 "Stittsie" – 5:55     
 "Poinciana" (Buddy Bernier, Nat Simon) – 3:06     
 "Boom-Boom" (Jimmy Mundy) – 2:38     
 "See See Rider" (traditional) – 4:52     
 "The Four Ninety" (Dameron) – 4:01     
 "Hey Pam" – 2:58  
Recorded in New York City on July 16 (tracks 1, 3, 4, 6 & 8) and July 17 (tracks 2, 5, 7 & 9), 1962

Personnel 
Sonny Stitt – alto saxophone
Reunald Jones, Blue Mitchell, Dick Vance – trumpet
Jimmy Cleveland, Matthew Gee – trombone
Willie Ruff – French horn
Duke Jordan – piano (tracks 2, 5, 7 & 9)
Perri Lee – organ (tracks 1, 3, 4, 6 & 8)
Joe Benjamin – bass
Frank Brown (tracks 2, 5, 7 & 9), Philly Joe Jones (tracks 1, 3, 4, 6 & 8) – drums
Tadd Dameron, Jimmy Mundy – arranger

References 

1963 albums
Atlantic Records albums
Sonny Stitt albums
Albums produced by Ahmet Ertegun
Albums arranged by Jimmy Mundy
Albums arranged by Tadd Dameron